The Land Before Time III: The Time of the Great Giving is a 1995 direct-to-video animated adventure musical film directed by Roy Allen Smith. It is the second sequel to The Land Before Time and the third film in the film franchise.

Plot 
A meteorite impacts near Great Valley, which causes a drought to threaten the dinosaurs' lives. The increasing lack of water causes conflicts between the inhabitants of Great Valley, who have previously lived in relative peace and harmony. When the inter-species situation deteriorates, Littlefoot and the others set out to find water to keep the peace in the valley. They are pursued by a trio of arrogant teenage dinosaurs consisting of Hyp the Hypsilophodon, Mutt the Muttaburrasaurus, and Nod the Nodosaurus. When Littlefoot and the others find a small lake, the trio emerges and claims the waterhole for themselves, demanding that Littlefoot and the others keep silent about their discovery. Unwilling to comply, Littlefoot and the others flee from the bullies. During the pursuit, the bullies are chased away by a wasp, and the children discover the reason behind the blockage of the water source.

Before they can return and tell the other inhabitants the truth, lightning hits a tree, and ignites a fire that spreads rapidly throughout the valley. The fire then devastates the valley destroying most of the green food. The dinosaurs barely make it to safety at the edge of Mysterious Beyond. When the children tell the adults of their discovery, disagreements about what to do erupts among the adults, preventing them from doing anything to utilize this knowledge. Hyp, Nod, and Mutt set out into Mysterious Beyond on their own to get to the water first. Anticipating the danger Hyp and his cohorts have gotten into and recognizing commonality with them, Littlefoot and the others follow to help if necessary. It becomes so when Hyp jumps into a tar pit after mistaking it for water. Littlefoot and his friends hatch a plan to haul Hyp out. Finally, Littlefoot and the others haul him out of the tar. Soon afterwards, the adults arrive, and Hyp is harshly scolded by his aggressive and grumpy father, leading Cera's dad to realize that he is too hard on Cera sometimes and, after advising Hyp’s dad to be softer on his son, that they need to work together to find the water.

Before they are able to take further steps, the herd is suddenly attacked by a pack of Velociraptors. The pursuit leads to a dam of boulders created by the rock slide that caused the drought. As the raptors and the adults battle, the children, including Hyp and his cronies, work together to break the dam. They all watch as the freed water washes away the raptors. The water also puts out the fires which are still burning in the valley. Finally, they manage to survive and land on the opposite bank. Now the herd is able to return to Great Valley. The herd returns to Great Valley, which now has enough water for them. However, when they return home, the fire has destroyed most of their green food. The now devastated plants in the valley are beyond repair from the fire. However, despite being irreparable, the dinosaurs find the spots in Great Valley where lots of green food still grows. They proportionately move from one verdant area to another and share everything they find. This pattern results in the event being called the Time of the Great Giving.

Voice cast 

 Scott McAfee as Littlefoot
 Candace Hutson as Cera
 Heather Hogan as Ducky
 Jeff Bennett as Petrie / Mutt / Iguanodon
 Rob Paulsen as Spike / Kosh
 Whit Hertford as Hyp
 Scott Menville as Nod
 Kenneth Mars as Grandpa Longneck
 Linda Gary as Grandma Longneck / Mother Quetzalcoatlus
 Nicholas Guest as Hyp's Father 
 Tress MacNeille as Stegosaurus / Spike & Ducky's mother / Petrie's Mother
 John Ingle as Narrator / Cera's father
 Frank Welker as the Velociraptors

Songs

Reception
In a brief Entertainment Weekly review, Michael Sauter criticized some modernisms in the dialogue but said that, "Littlefoot and his friends still retain their youthful charm." In August 2014, the New York Post ranked each of the 13 Land Before Time films released up to that point and placed The Time of the Great Giving at number 2, noting the "genuinely terrifying" velociraptors. The film holds a 60% "Fresh" rating on Rotten Tomatoes, with an average critic score of 5.4 out of 10.

In his 2002 book Welcome to the Desert of the Real, Slovenian Marxist philosopher Slavoj Žižek cited a song from this movie, "When You're Big", as an example of "hegemonic liberal multiculturalist ideology." Quoting the song's lyrics, Žižek wrote, "The same message is repeated again and again: we are all different — some of us are big, some are small; some know how to fight, others know how to flee — but we should learn to live with these differences, to perceive them as something which makes our lives richer." Žižek notes the inconsistency of this vision in the fact that the dinosaurs prey on each other, and have other irreconcilable differences: "The problem, of course, is: how far do we go? It takes all sorts - does that mean nice and brutal, poor and rich, victims and torturers? The reference to the dinosaur kingdom is especially ambiguous here, with its brutal character of animal species devouring each other - is this also one of the things that 'need to be done to make our life fun'? The very inner inconsistency of this vision of the prelapsarian 'land before time' thus bears witness to how the message of collaboration-in-differences is ideology at its purest."

The film won "Best Animated Video Production" at the 24th Annie Awards in 1996, and was nominated for "Best Genre Video Release" at the 22nd Saturn Awards that same year, losing to V: The Final Battle.

Home video release history 

The original VHS release contained a sneak preview of The Land Before Time IV: Journey Through the Mists (1996) prior to the film, which is a music video for the song "It Takes All Sorts".
 December 12, 1995 (VHS and laserdisc)
 May 13, 1997 (VHS and laserdisc - The Land Before Time Collection)
 December 1, 1998 (VHS and laserdisc, the laserdisc release - Universal Family Features)
 December 4, 2001 (VHS)
 December 10, 2002 (DVD)
 December 2, 2003 (VHS and DVD - 4 Movie Dino Pack (Volume 1) and 9 Movie Dino Pack)
 September 27, 2005 (DVD - 2 Dino-Mite Movies)

References

External links 

 

The Land Before Time films
Direct-to-video sequel films
1995 direct-to-video films
1995 animated films
1995 films
1990s English-language films
Universal Animation Studios animated films
Universal Pictures direct-to-video animated films
Films scored by Michael Tavera
1990s American animated films
Animated films about dinosaurs
1990s children's animated films
Films directed by Roy Allen Smith